Me was Ray Stevens' twentieth studio album and his third and final for Mercury Records, released in 1983. In 1982, Stevens returned briefly to Mercury to record this album (his first for that label in 20 years) before moving to MCA Records in 1984. The front of the album cover shows Stevens portraying a painter painting a self-portrait; while the back shows the finished portrait on a table along with a second self-portrait that is sketched by pencil, a cup filled with paint brushes, the paint tray, tubes of paint, a small glass filled with water and a rose, and a lamp. Two singles were lifted from the album: "Love Will Beat Your Brains Out" (which did not chart) and "My Dad."

Track listing

Personnel 
 Produced by Jerry Kennedy and Ray Stevens
 Arranged by Ray Stevens
 Engineer – Stuart Keathley
 Recorded and Mixed at Ray Stevens Studio (Nashville, Tennessee).
 Mastered by Randy Kling at Disc Mastering, Inc. (Nashville, Tennessee).
 Photography – Slick Lawson
 Paintings and Sketches – Susan Scott

Musicians
 Ray Stevens – vocals, other synthesizers 
 Rodger Morris – acoustic piano, Rhodes piano, Gleemon synthesizer 
 Mark Casstevens – acoustic guitars 
 John Clausi – electric guitars 
 Steve Gibson – electric guitars 
 Weldon Myrick – dobro, steel guitar
 Jack Williams – bass
 Jerry Carrigan – drums  (1, 3-10)
 James Stroud – drums (2)
 Terry McMillan – percussion, harmonica, Jew's harp
 Nashville String Machine – strings 
 Suzi Ragsdale – backing vocals (1), female vocal (7)
 The Cherry Sisters (Sheri Huffman, Lisa Silver and Diane Tidwell) – backing vocals 
 Alan Moore – backing vocals 
 Hurshel Wiginton – backing vocals

Chart performance

Singles

References

1983 albums
Ray Stevens albums
Mercury Records albums